Cernache do Bonjardim, Nesperal e Palhais is a civil parish in the municipality of Sertã, Portugal. It was formed in 2013 by the merger of the former parishes of  Cernache do Bonjardim, Nesperal and Palhais.

References

Freguesias of Sertã